Hermann Marggraff (1809–64) was a German poet and humorous author.  He was born at Züllichau;Brandenburg, studied at Berlin; and, devoting himself to journalism, lived and wrote in Leipzig, Munich, Augsburg, and Frankfort, finally settling in Leipzig (1853) as editor of the Blätter für literarische Unterhaltung.  He wrote the critical essay, Deutschlands Jüngste Kultur- und Litteraturepoche (1839); several plays, e. g., Das Täubchen von Amsterdam; humorous novels, including Justus und Chrysostomus, Gebrüder Pech (1840), Johannes Mackel (1841), and Fritz Beutel (1855), after the fashion of Baron Munchausen; a biography of Ernst Schulze (Leipzig, 1855); Schillers und Kärners Freundschaftsbund (1859); Gedichte (1857); Balladenchronik (1862).

References
 NIE

  
 

1809 births
1864 deaths
People from Sulechów
German biographers
Male biographers
German journalists
German male journalists
German poets
German humorists
People from the Province of Brandenburg
19th-century German journalists
German male poets
German male novelists
19th-century poets
19th-century German novelists
19th-century German male writers
19th-century German writers